Abduraimov (masculine) or Abduraimova (feminine) is a surname. Notable people with the surname include:
Azamat Abduraimov (born 1966), Uzbekistani footballer
Behzod Abduraimov (born 1990), Uzbekistani pianist
Berador Abduraimov (born 1943), Soviet footballer and manager
Nigina Abduraimova (born 1994), Uzbekistani tennis player